Lost Lake is located entirely within the city limits of Mound, Minnesota. It is part of Lake Minnetonka and considered by the city of Mound to be important to its re-development plans with the hope being that boat users will increase its downtown business traffic. In the past, lake steamers used Lost Lake's channel or canal to bring tourists into the downtown area, when Lake Minnetonka was a resort area. The channel has been re-dredged, docks have been built, and the clean-up of nearby contaminated soil has been done. The lake's name is assumed to be based on its being nearly completely overgrown by cattails and reeds. But that is said to serve the valuable purpose of filtering the surface runoff into Lake Minnetonka.

References

Lakes of Minnesota
Lakes of Hennepin County, Minnesota